Marles-les-Mines is a commune in the Pas-de-Calais department in the Hauts-de-France region of France.

Geography
As the name suggests, an ex-coalmining town, which now relies on light industry and farming. The river Clarence flows through the commune. Vis-à-Marles station is served by regional trains on the line from Saint-Pol-sur-Ternoise to Béthune and Lille-Flandres.

Population

Places of interest
 The church of St. Vaast, dating from the sixteenth century.
 Some remains of the coal industry – pit head machinery and buildings.

See also
Communes of the Pas-de-Calais department

References

Marleslesmines
County of Artois